Luiz Antônio de Godoy Alves Júnior, better known as Júnior Godoi (born September 20, 1978 in São Paulo), is a Brazilian footballer (midfielder or striker.

He last played for FC Metalurh Zaporizhia. He joined Legia from SC Tavriya Simferopol. His Brazilian clubs were São Paulo FC and União Agrícola Barbarense Futebol Clube. Junior Godoi scored a goal in the game versus FK Austria Wien in the first round of UEFA Cup 2006-07. After being absent from football for 6 months due to a serious left knee injury, Godoi returned to play again in the Ukrainian Premier League, joining Zorya Luhansk on September 8, 2008.

Career
Godoi started playing football in Brazil at the age of 13. He then played for the nursery school "Palmeiras". There is also information that he played for São Paulo FC". At age 19, he signed a professional contract with Palmeiras. Then defended the colors of the club União Barbarense.

In the winter season 2003/04 Godoi moved to Tavriya Simferopol in Ukraine, playing with compatriot Edmar. In his Ukrainian Premier League debut March 14, 2004 in a match against Dynamo Kyiv (0:0). November 6, 2005 in a match against Volyn Lutsk (1:2), Godoi scored a goal and thus became the author of the 500th goal of "Tavria" in the championships of Ukraine. Godoi left "Tavria" because of disagreements with the coach Mikhail Fomenko.

In late August 2006, he moved on a free transfer to Legia Warsaw in Poland by signing a four-year contract. The club paid him 500 000 euros. In extra-debuted September 8, 2006 in a match against Arka Gdynia (1:1). September 14, 2006 he made his debut in a UEFA Cup match against Austria Wien (1:1), on the 44th-minute Godoi scored a goal. In his period in Warsaw he suffered a knee injury, the recovery took 7 months. In the 2006/07 season, Legia Warsaw was the bronze medalist, Godoi had 13 matches and scored 1 goal, in the Polish Cup.

In September 2008, he moved back to Ukraine and signed a contract with Zorya Luhansk. The team debuted September 20, 2008 in  match against FC Kharkiv (2:3), in the 27th minute he scored a goal. In 2008/09 season Godoi had become a major player in the team, playing 14 games and scoring 4 goals. In the summer of 2009 left the club and began to train young men in Brazil, and maintain game form. In January 2010, received the status of free agent.

After playing for Brazilian club Vila Nova from the city of Goiânia in Brazilian Serie B (20 matches and 1 goal) he moved to Ukraine again and signed a contract with Zaporozhian Metallurg Zaporizhya in September 2010. He debuted September 26, 2010 in an away match against Vorskla Poltava (2:1), Godoi started the match. In October 2010, together with the team won the Cup Yevhen Kucherevskyi by beating the FC Dnipro Dnipropetrovsk (2:3). November 21, 2010 in a match against FC Karpaty Lviv (0:0) Godoi after a collision with goalkeeper Vitaliy Rudenko guests received a serious injury, he carried off the field on a stretcher and taken to the ambulance to the hospital. There, they straightened his shoulder under general anesthesia, after which he could not play for several months.

In "Metallurg" Godoi became a major player and team leader, he also the captain . As a result of the 2010/11 season, "Metallurg" took place last 16 and relegated to the Ukrainian First League. After one season in the Ukrainian First League the club was promoted back to the Ukrainian Premier League.

References

1978 births
Living people
Brazilian footballers
Brazilian expatriate footballers
Expatriate footballers in Ukraine
Expatriate footballers in Poland
Legia Warsaw players
SC Tavriya Simferopol players
FC Zorya Luhansk players
FC Metalurh Zaporizhzhia players
Ekstraklasa players
Ukrainian Premier League players
Brazilian expatriate sportspeople in Ukraine
Brazilian expatriate sportspeople in Poland
Association football midfielders
Footballers from São Paulo